Wola Paprotnia  is a village in the administrative district of Gmina Mrozy, within Mińsk County, Masovian Voivodeship, in east-central Poland.

The village has a population of 198.

References

Wola Paprotnia